Bihag (International title: The Silent Thief / ) is a 2019 Philippine television drama series starring Max Collins, Jason Abalos, Sophie Albert, Mark Herras and Neil Ryan Sese. The series aired on GMA Network's Afternoon Prime block and worldwide via GMA Pinoy TV from April 1, 2019 to August 16, 2019, replacing My Special Tatay.

Series overview

Episodes

April 2019

May 2019

June 2019

July 2019

August 2019

References

Lists of Philippine drama television series episodes